Patrick M. Daughterty (November 6, 1928 – May 20, 1997) was an American politician.

Daughterty was born in Minneapolis, Minnesota and graduated from DeLaSalle High School, Minneapolis, in 1946. He went to Dunwoody College of Technology in 1953. Daughtery served in the United States Marine Corps. He lived in Minneapolis with his wife and family and was a licensed master steamfitter. Duaghtery served in the Minnesota House of Representatives in 1971 and 1972 and on the Minneapolis City Council from 1977 to 1983. He was a Democrat. Daughterty died in Minneapolis from a heart attack.

References

1928 births
1997 deaths
Politicians from Minneapolis
Military personnel from Minneapolis
Minneapolis City Council members
Democratic Party members of the Minnesota House of Representatives